The Women's Super League Golden Boot is an annual association football award presented to the leading goalscorer in Women's Super League (WSL). The award is sponsored by Barclays. The most recent winner is Sam Kerr who scored 21 goals for Chelsea in the 2021–22 season. Vivianne Miedema and Sam Kerr are the only players to win the Golden Boot multiple times having both won it twice.

Winners

See also
The FA Women's Football Awards
List of sports awards honoring women
Premier League Golden Boot – the equivalent award in men's football

References

English women's football trophies and awards
Women's Football Awards
Annual events in England
Annual sporting events in the United Kingdom
Women's Super League awards